Federalist No. 30 is an essay by Alexander Hamilton, the thirtieth of The Federalist Papers. It was published in the New York Packet on December 28, 1787, under the pseudonym Publius, the name under which all The Federalist papers were published. This is the first of seven essays by Hamilton on the then-controversial issue of taxation. It is titled "Concerning the General Power of Taxation".

Brief Precis 

Alexander Hamilton details that taxes are extremely important to our government.  Hamilton believes that the power to collect taxes deemed necessary is crucial for the government.  Hamilton then details the differences between internal and external taxes.  He argues that the federal government needs a power of taxation equal to its necessities, both present, and future.  External taxes alone cannot provide enough revenue for a government as extensive as the one proposed, especially in a time of war. He believes that their young country could not survive without funds.

History 
Federalist No. 30 is an important paper that was much needed during the latter part of the 1700s. Since America had just won the American Revolution, the country needed to find a way to set up a system for the financial situation. Hamilton was worried that the people would not appreciate the taxes. However, he believes that taxes are necessary in order to let the citizens live freely and without fear of their country going bankrupt.

James Madison seemed to have had an issue with who got the power of taxation. He did not believe that the legislative branch had the right to tax to contribute in helping the welfare.

References

External links 

 Text of The Federalist No. 30: congress.gov

30
1787 in American law
1787 essays